Waitaoro (1848 – 26 March 1929) was a notable New Zealand tribal leader. Of Māori descent, she identified with the Ngāti Tama iwi. She was born in the Chatham Islands, New Zealand, in about 1848.

References

1848 births
1929 deaths
Ngāti Tama people
People from the Chatham Islands